The single justice procedure (SJP) was introduced by the Criminal Justice and Courts Act 2015. The procedure is designed to be an accessible, speedy, effective and more efficient means of delivering justice when dealing with the most minor summary offences.  Typical offences dealt with via this means include minor road traffic offences such as speeding and driving without insurance, TV licence evasion and similar matters.  Defendants receive notice of the charge by post, including a statement setting out the facts of the offence, and guidance about what next steps to take, including their rights to legal representation.  They have the option to plead guilty by post, online or to ask for a Court hearing in person.  If a defendant pleads "not guilty" their case will be transferred out of the single justice procedure process, and listed for a in-person Court hearing in the usual manner. Those pleading guilty, or those who do not respond to the initial notice within 21 days, will have their cases dealt with by a single justice of the peace based on the papers only, i.e. no prosecutor or defendant will be present in person.

Approximately 535 000 cases were heard in the Magistrates court of England and Wales via this procedure in 2020.  The prosecution (typically the Crown Prosecution Service) must prove their case beyond reasonable doubt, and their written case must satisfy exactly the same rules as would be expected in open court.

Advantages and criticisms of the single justice procedure 
HMCTS argue that the single justice procedure "is not a radical new innovation, but a modification of existing procedures dating from the Magistrates' Court Act 1957".  The procedure frees up time for the Crown Prosecution Service and the Magistrates' Court to focus on more serious and complex offences, and enables defendants to plead guilty and have their cases heard by a magistrate, without having to go to Court.  However criticisms have been made that the process is not adequately transparent, it happening largely behind "closed doors",  and some concerns were raised during the Coronavirus pandemic over the dilution of legal advice to magistrates' after it had emerged that magistrates were being required to share access to a single legal adviser over the phone or via MS Teams.

In an effort to improve transparency of the single justice procedure, HMCTS has published a protocol on sharing court lists, registers and documents with the media.  It sets out an approach to circulating lists of pending SJP cases, verdicts (results/register) and sentences, and makes clear that any member of the public is entitled to request the outcome of an SJP case (or indeed any other case).

References 

Law of the United Kingdom